Seagraves may refer to:

Places
Seagraves, Texas

People

Chris Seagraves, English footballer
Eleanor Roosevelt Seagraves (born 1927), American librarian, educator, historian, and editor 
Mark Seagraves (born 1966), British professional footballer
Ralph Seagraves (1929 – 1998), American executive, president of R.J. Reynolds
Skip Seagraves (born 1982) Canadian football player

Other
Seagraves Independent School District in Seagraves, Texas
Seagraves High School in Seagraves, Texas

See also
Segraves (disambiguation)
Seagrave (disambiguation)
Segrave (disambiguation)